Oxychilus lineolatus is a species of small air-breathing land snail, a terrestrial pulmonate gastropod mollusk in the family Oxychilidae, the glass snails. This species is  endemic to the Azores.

References
.

Molluscs of the Azores
Oxychilus
Gastropods described in 1991
Taxonomy articles created by Polbot